, also known by his Chinese style name , was a prince of Ryukyu Kingdom.

Prince Yoshimura was the third son of King Shō Boku. He was also a half-brother of Crown Prince Shō Tetsu and Prince Urasoe Chōō, and a full-brother of Prince Ginowan Chōshō.

He was given Katsuren magiri (modern part of Uruma) as his hereditary fief in 1771. He was bestowed the title "Prince Yoshimura" instead of "Prince Katsuren" because the character "" (katsu, means "victory") was not allowed to use in name. Prince Yoshimura established a new royal family: Yoshimura Udun.

Prince Yoshimura served as sessei from 1798 to 1802.

References

|-

1763 births
1821 deaths
Princes of Ryūkyū
Sessei
People of the Ryukyu Kingdom
Ryukyuan people
18th-century Ryukyuan people
19th-century Ryukyuan people